Yang Xiu (175–219), courtesy name Dezu, was an official and adviser serving under the warlord Cao Cao during the late Eastern Han dynasty of China.

Life
Yang Xiu was a son of Yang Biao (楊彪) and a grandson of Yang Ci (楊賜). His mother, Lady Yuan (袁氏), was Yuan Shu's sister.

Sometime during the 200s, Yang Xiu was nominated as xiaolian and became a Registrar (主簿) under Cao Cao, the Imperial Chancellor. He was said to have been skilled in both civil and military affairs and understood Cao Cao well. Because of this, Yang Xiu became an influential figure in the government.

Yang Xiu was a close friend of Cao Cao's son, Cao Zhi, and became involved in the succession struggle between Cao Zhi and his brother Cao Pi. Yang Xiu's close links with Cao Zhi caused him misfortune during Cao Zhi's occasional misbehaviour such as the incident in Ye city, where Cao Zhi drunkenly rode through the gate reserved for only the emperor. But the final blow was when Yang Xiu was discovered to have leaked the council's discussion agenda to Cao Zhi so that his friend could prepare beforehand and impress Cao Cao. Because of this and remembering his connection with Yuan Shu, Cao Cao had Yang Xiu executed.

However Cao Pi personally did not dislike Yang Xiu. Cao Pi's favourite sword was a gift from Yang Xiu and Cao Pi regularly kept the sword by his side. Later, after becoming the emperor, Cao Pi remembered that Yang Xiu once said that the sword originally belong to Wang Miao. A nostalgic Cao Pi then searched for Wang Miao's whereabouts and awarded Miao with food and clothes.

Yang Xiu's death was commonly related to the story of "chicken ribs", which was mentioned in Pei Songzhi's annotation of the Sanguozhi, and was popularized by the novel Romance of the Three Kingdoms. It was thought that the true reason for Xiu's death was not really because of his relationship with Cao Zhi, but because he correctly guessed Cao Cao's inner thoughts, which was taboo, and carelessly revealed these thoughts to other people, which was even more forbidden. People like Cao Cao always wanted to mystify themselves and have political secrets which could not be arbitrarily shared with anyone. Hence, subordinates like Yang Xiu were considered an imminent threat.

Prior to Yang Xiu's death, Cao Cao had written a letter to his father Yang Biao, reproaching him for his son's arrogance. After news of his execution, Yang Biao was struck by grief and self-blame, becoming gray-haired and thin. Upon hearing this, Cao Cao sent Yang Biao many gifts to compensate for the loss of his son.

Anecdotes

In Romance of the Three Kingdoms
In the 14th-century historical novel Romance of the Three Kingdoms, Cao Cao thinks that Yang Xiu is too boastful and overconfident in his cleverness, and eventually kills him after what is known as the "chicken rib" incident.

At the time, Cao Cao's army was fighting against Liu Bei during the famous Hanzhong campaign. The battle had been going unfavorably for Cao Cao and he planned to retreat, but did not openly admit this. One evening, when a messenger asked him for that night's verbal passcode, Cao Cao saw some chicken ribs in his soup and thoughtlessly answered "chicken rib." Yang Xiu interpreted Cao Cao's message as a metaphor for "retreat" and instructed all generals to have their soldiers pack their bags and break camp. Yang Xiu's logic was thus: chicken ribs are inedible, but not completely worthless, similar to the difficult situation that Cao Cao was facing. When Cao Cao was alerted of Yang Xiu's action, he was enraged and executed Yang Xiu.

Later on, as the battle turned even more against him, Cao Cao finally ordered a retreat. Remembering Xiu's prediction, Cao Cao had his subordinate's body collected and gave him a proper funeral.

In an earlier chapter, Yang Xiu was described by Mi Heng as one of the two sole "talented" officials under Cao Cao (the other being Kong Rong). However, this should be taken with a grain of salt, as Mi Heng's other opinions, actions, and ultimate fate suggest he is a poor judge of character.

See also
 Lists of people of the Three Kingdoms

Notes

References

 Chen, Shou (3rd century). Records of the Three Kingdoms (Sanguozhi).
 
 Fan, Ye (5th century). Book of the Later Han (Houhanshu).
 Luo, Guanzhong (14th century). Romance of the Three Kingdoms (Sanguo Yanyi).
 Pei, Songzhi (5th century). Annotations to Records of the Three Kingdoms (Sanguozhi zhu).
 Sima, Guang (1084). Zizhi Tongjian.

Yuan Shu and associates
Officials under Cao Cao
175 births
219 deaths
Executed Han dynasty people
3rd-century executions
People executed by the Han dynasty
2nd-century Chinese people
3rd-century Chinese people